Andrée Clément (7 August 1918 – 31 May 1954) was a French film actress. Her husband was killed in 1940 during the Battle of France. She herself died from tuberculosis in Paris in 1954 at the age of thirty five.

Filmography

References

Bibliography
 Hayward, Susan. French Costume Drama of the 1950s: Fashioning Politics in Film. Intellect Books, 2010.

External links

1918 births
1954 deaths
French film actresses
Actresses from Marseille
20th-century French actresses
20th-century deaths from tuberculosis
Tuberculosis deaths in France